The Central Bank of the Republic of Guinea (BCRG) is the central bank of Guinea.  The headquarters of the bank is located in the capital city of Conakry. The current governor is Dr Karamo Kaba.

History 

The bank was established on 1 March 1960. Ousmane Baldé was president of the bank in the 1960s before his execution in 1971. In 1972 President Touré took over governorship of the Bank, formally attaching it to the Presidency.

Governors

Activities 
The Bank is active in promoting financial inclusion policy and is a leading member of the Alliance for Financial Inclusion. It is also one of the original 17 regulatory institutions to make specific national commitments to financial inclusion under the Maya Declaration during the 2011 Global Policy Forum held in Mexico.

See also

 Economy of Guinea
 Guinean franc
 List of central banks of Africa

References

External links
  Central Bank of the Republic of Guinea home page

Banks of Guinea
Economy of Guinea
Guinea
Buildings and structures in Conakry
Banks established in 1960
1960 establishments in Guinea